Arkansaw may refer to:

Places
 Arkansaw Territory, a U.S. territory from 1819 to 1836
 Arkansaw, Wisconsin, a census-designated place in Pepin County

See also
Arkansas, a homophone